School No.1 is a public school in Sükhbaatar (district), Ulaanbaatar, Mongolia. Mongolia's first government-run public primary school was founded in 1921, and its first secondary school, School No.1, was founded in 1923.

As of 2010, there are about 2,150 students in 46 classes, 80 teachers, and 20 service workers in the school. About 8,000 students graduated from the school in the last academic years.

Campus
The school campus is in the center of the Ulaanbaatar city. School No.1 has three buildings, one of which is an elementary school building.

History
When the school began in 1923, it had six female students.
In 1989, a pilot project to teach the Mongolian script was begun at School No.1.

Notable alumni
Erdeniin Bat-Üül
Miyeegombyn Enkhbold
Mendsaikhany Enkhsaikhan

References

Schools in Mongolia
Educational institutions established in 1923
1923 establishments in Mongolia